B. J. P. Mendis was the 43rd Surveyor General of Sri Lanka. He was appointed in 2004, succeeding P. A. Ariyaratne, and held the office until 2009. He was succeeded by S. M. W. Fernando.

References

M